Hygrophila gracillima is a species of plant in the family Acanthaceae. It is found in Namibia and possibly Angola. Its natural habitats are intermittent rivers and intermittent freshwater marshes. It is threatened by habitat loss.

References

gracillima
Flora of Namibia
Least concern plants
Taxonomy articles created by Polbot